Orienspace (also named Orien Space Shandong Technology and oSpace) is a Chinese private space launch enterprise founded in 2020 and developing the medium-class orbital launch vehicle named Gravity-1 (Yinli-1).
Intended for a first flight in 2023, the rocket would have the capacity of lifting a 3-tonne payload to LEO.Orienspace is headquartered in Jinan, Shandong, and has liaison offices in Qingdao and Shanghai.

In June 2021, the company raised $62 million in funding.

In November 2021 the company appointed Yao Song as Co-CEO who was formerly founder of Shenjian Technology, a company that developed semiconductors for autonomous driving, smart security, cloud computing, and AI.

In January 2022 the company has secured nearly $47.3 million in its pre-Series A round of financing to develop powerful rocket engines.

In May 2022 the company has raised $59.9 million in a Series A funding round.

In November 2022 the company revealed its launch service plan, confirming their maiden flight of Gravity-1 for mid-2023 and introducing two rideshare opportunities for the fourth quarter of 2023 and the first quarter of 2024, with a total of 10 launches planned between 2024 and 2025. In March 2023 the date of the maiden flight has been moved to Q4 2023, with the following rideshare opportunities to take place starting from the second quarter of 2024.

Marketplace 
Orienspace is in competition with several other Chinese space rocket startups, being Galactic Energy, LandSpace, LinkSpace, ExPace, i-Space, OneSpace and Deep Blue Aerospace.

References

External links 

 Official website

Aerospace companies of China
Space launch vehicles of China
Private spaceflight companies
Commercial spaceflight
Commercial launch service providers
Chinese companies established in 2020
Companies based in Shandong